Jasmin Jüttner (née Bleul; 22 May 1993) is a German karateka. She is a multiple German champion in the Kata discipline.

Career
Jüttner began taking karate lessons at TV Strötzbach at the age of seven. After she was accepted into the Bayern squad, she started for the KD Untermerzbach for a few years. Since 2005, she has been training in the Budocenter of the kata trainer Efthimios Karamitsos in Frankfurt. From 2007 to 2016, she had been German champion in kata singles 10 times in a row. In 2013, she was Shōtōkan world champion in Liverpool in the WSKA with the German women's national kata team. In November 2014, she became WKF world champion in Bremen with the team of the national kata team. In November 2014, she was also elected athlete of the month by ran with the women's national team. Her favorite kata is the Unsu. In preparation for the competition, she is on the mat up to eleven times a week. She wears the third Dan Shōtōkan karate. She received her third Dan in recognition of her achievements at the 2014 Karate World Cup.

Jüttner secured her places on the German squad in the women's kata category by finishing among the top four in the final pool round of the 2021 World Qualification Tournament in Paris, France. In November 2021, she competed at the 2021 World Karate Championships held in Dubai, United Arab Emirates.

She won one of the bronze medals in the women's individual kata event at the 2022 European Karate Championships held in 
Gaziantep, Turkey. She competed in the women's kata at the 2022 World Games held in Birmingham, United States.

Personal life
Jüttner has been married to karateka Philip Jüttner since September 2017.

References

External links 
 

1993 births
Living people
Place of birth missing (living people)
German female karateka
European Games competitors for Germany
Karateka at the 2019 European Games
Karateka at the 2020 Summer Olympics
Olympic karateka of Germany
Competitors at the 2022 World Games
People from Aschaffenburg
Sportspeople from Lower Franconia
20th-century German women
21st-century German women